Til (also Romanized as Tīl) is a village in Guney-ye Gharbi Rural District of Tasuj District, Shabestar County, East Azerbaijan province, Iran. At the 2006 National Census, its population was 2,642 in 817 households. The following census in 2011 counted 2,547 people in 835 households. The latest census in 2016 showed a population of 3,303 people in 1,109 households; it was the largest village in its rural district.

References 

Shabestar County

Populated places in East Azerbaijan Province

Populated places in Shabestar County